Ciliosculum is a genus of fungi within the Hyaloscyphaceae family. This is a monotypic genus, containing the single species Ciliosculum invisibile.

References

External links
Ciliosculum at Index Fungorum

Hyaloscyphaceae
Monotypic Leotiomycetes genera